54th/Cermak is an 'L' station and the current terminus of the CTA's Pink Line. It was the terminus of the former Cermak branch of the Blue Line. It is located at Cermak Road between 54th and Laramie Avenues in Cicero, Illinois. It is the only terminal with only one track used for service. Trains board on the eastern half of 54th/Cermak station and unload on the western half. Tracks continue westward to the 54th Yard, the maintenance and storage yard for Pink Line trains.

Bus connections 

CTA
21 Cermak
N60 Blue Island/26th (Owl Service - Overnight only) 

Pace
302 Ogden-Stanley
316 Laramie Avenue
322 Cermak Road-22nd Street

Notes and references

Notes 

Platforms and tracks

North platform: It is served by CTA's Pink Line to Loop in downtown Chicago.
South platform: It is served by CTA's Pink Line to 54th Yard

References

External links 

54th/Cermak Station Page at Chicago-L.org
CTA Pink Line 54th/Cermak Station Page

Laramie Avenue entrance from Google Maps Street View

 Cicero, Illinois
 CTA Pink Line stations
Chicago "L" terminal stations
 Railway stations in the United States opened in 1912
 Railway stations in Chicago
1912 establishments in Illinois